The Government of India Act 1915 (5 & 6 Geo. V, c. 61) was an act of the Parliament of the United Kingdom, which consolidated prior Acts of Parliament concerning British India into a single act. It was passed in July 1915 and went into effect on 1 January 1916.

The act repealed 47 prior acts of Parliament, starting with an act of 1770, and replaced them with a single act containing 135 sections and five schedules. It was introduced first to the House of Lords, where it was referred to a joint committee of Parliament chaired by Lord Loreburn. The committee removed several provisions which went beyond the simple consolidation of existing law.

A supplemental act, mostly technical in nature and including several of the provisions struck out of the consolidation act, was introduced and passed in 1916, becoming the "Government of India (Amendment) Act 1916" (6 & 7 Geo. V, c. 37).

The Government of India Act 1915 and its supplemental act the following year "made the English statute law relating to India easier to understand, and therefore easier to amend." The Government of India Act 1919 made substantial changes to the law.

References

Acts of the Parliament of the United Kingdom concerning India
United Kingdom Acts of Parliament 1915
July 1915 events
1915 in India